Vicol may refer to:

Maria Vicol (born 1935), Romanian fencer
Vicol Calabiciov, Romanian sprint canoer